Tabra may refer to:
Tabra, Iran, a village in Khuzestan Province, Iran
Tăbra River, in Romania
Saint Tabra, 5th century Christian saint, see Theonistus, Tabra, and Tabratha